
This is a list of prominent Senegalese authors (by surname)

A - G 

Agbo, Berte-Evelyne, poet, also connected with Benin
Bâ, Mariama (1929–1981), French-language novelist
Barry, Kesso (1948– ), autobiographer born in Guinea
Barry, Mariama, French-language autobiographical novelist
Benga, Sokhna (1967– ), novelist and poet
Bocoum, Jacqueline Fatima, former journalist turned author and programme director
Bugul, Ken (1948– ), autobiographical writer and novelist
Cisse, Mamadou (1956– )
Diakhate, Lamine (1928–1987), poet and novelist
Diallo, Nafissatou Niang (1941–1982), autobiographer, novelist and children's writer
Dieng, Mame Younousse, novelist in French and Wolof
Aminata Sophie Dièye (1973–2016), journalist, novelist and playwright
Babacar Sedikh Diouf (1928– ), historian, author and intellectual
Diouf, Nafissatou Dia (1973– ), novelist and children's writer,
Diouf, Sylviane, historian and lecturer
Diome, Fatou (1968– ), novelist
Diop, Alioune (1910–1980), essayist and intellectual
Diop, Birago (1906–1989), French-language folklorist, poet and autobiographer
Diop, Boubacar Boris (1946– ), novelist
Diop, Cheikh Anta (1923–1986), Afrocentric historian and anthropologist
Diop, David (1927–1960), poet
Dogbeh, Richard, also connected with Benin, Togo and Côte d'Ivoire (1932–2003)
Fall, Khadi (1948– ), poet
Fall, Kiné Kirama (1934– ), poet
Fall, Malick (1920–1978), French-language novelist and poet
Faye, Louis Diène (1936– ), anthropologist and scholar of Serer religion, history and culture
Gnimagnon, Christine Adjahi (1945– ), also connected with Benin

H - O 

Hane, Khadidjatou (Khady) (1962– )
Joof, Tamsier (1973– )
Ka, Aminata Maïga (1940–2005), French-language novelist
Kane, Cheikh Hamidou (1928– ), French-language novelist
Kane, Ndèye Fatou (1986– ), Senegalese novelist and feminist, granddaughter of Cheikh Hamidou Kane
Mbaye, Annette (d'Erneville) (1926– )
Amina Sow Mbaye (1937– ) French-language poet and novelist
Mordasini, Diana
Ndao, Cheikh Aliou (1933– ), novelist, playwright and poet
Adja Ndèye Boury Ndiaye (1936– ), novelist
Ndiaye, Marie, born in France (1967– ), novelist
Ndoye, Mariama (1953– ), novelist, short story writer and children's writer
Niane, Djibril Tamsir (1932–2021), novelist and historian
Niang, Mame Bassine (1951–2013), writer and lawyer
Niang, Fatou Siga (1932–2022)

P - Z 

Sadji, Abdoulaye (1910–1961), novelist and children's writer
Sall, Amadou Lamine (1951– ), poet
Sall, Ibrahima (1949– ), novelist, poet, playwright and short story writer
Sarr, Alioune (1908–2001), historian and politician, scholar of Serer history
Seek, Alioune Badara (1945– ), novelist
Sembène, Ousmane (1923–2007), writer and filmmaker
Sène, Fama Diagne (1969– ), novelist and playwright 
Senghor, Léopold Sédar (1906–2001), poet and politician
Catherine Shan (1952– ), French language novelist and film director
Ousmane Socé (1911–1973), French-language novelist
Sow, Fatou Ndiaye (1956–2004)
Sow Fall, Aminata (1941– ), novelist
Sylla, Khady (1963–2013)
Thiaw, Issa Laye (1943–2017), historian, theologian and scholar of Serer religion and history
Rama Thiaw (1978– ), filmmaker, screenwriter
Traoré, Abibatou (1973– )
Vieyra, Myriam Warner (1939–2017), novelist born in Guadeloupe
Wheatley, Phillis (1753–1784)

See also 
 List of Senegalese
 List of Gambian writers
 List of African writers by country

References

External links
UWA's list of women writers from French speaking Africa
Contemporary Africa Database (Senegal section)
Contemporary African writers/authors
Africa Resource research data

Senegalese
Writers